Lynx, the trading name of 'Coastal Red Ltd', is an independent bus company based in King's Lynn and operating services across west and north Norfolk and eastern Cambridgeshire.

History
Coastal Red was founded by Stephen Challis and Andrew Warnes in 2013. The pair (along with Julian Patterson) had previously established Konectbus in 1999 before selling it to the Go-Ahead Group in March 2010. Having considered construction and engineering, the idea of a new bus operation formally began in spring 2014. Julian Patterson would come aboard later that year upon leaving Go-Ahead.

Operations commenced for Lynx on 6 January 2015, with a school contract between Southery and Downham Market Academy. On 26 January 2015, their first public bus service began, operating hourly between King's Lynn to Hunstanton, seven days a week.

Lynx expanded its network of routes with the takeover three Council-subsidised bus services from Stagecoach in Norfolk in September 2017, followed by a further eight former Stagecoach routes from 29 April 2018, after Stagecoach closed their King's Lynn depot. Among the services taken on following Stagecoach's withdrawal from the area was the western half of the popular and well established Coasthopper service between King's Lynn and Cromer. Lynx took over operation of the King's Lynn to Wells-next-the-Sea section of this route, rebranded it as Coastliner 36 and extended the service inland from Wells to Fakenham. A further three services were taken over from Stagecoach in September 2018.

During 2019, Lynx funded a 'comprehensive' refurbishment/renewing of the Queen Elizabeth Hospital, King's Lynn bus shelters, and a next bus information screen was provided by Norfolk County Council.

A brand new, thoroughly redesigned website (powered by the 'BusHub Mobility Platform') launched in December 2019, including a live bus tracker, fare calculator and journey planner, with an iOS & Android app following shortly afterwards in January 2020

Fleet
Lynx commenced operations with a fleet of four single-decker Optare Tempos, including an experimental prototype purchased directly from Optare. It has standardised on the type and by April 2018 it was operating the largest fleet of Tempos in the United Kingdom with 26.

Since September 2016, Lynx has also operated double-deckers including Optare Spectra and Wright Pulsar Gemini bodied DAF DB250LFs and Leyland Olympians. Two new, bespoke Alexander Dennis Enviro400 MMCs arrived in spring 2021 for added capacity on the Coastliner route.

Lynx own a Leyland National, which is operated as a heritage bus in a semi-preserved state, painted in Lynx's standard red livery. Delivered new to Hants & Dorset in November 1977, it has been used in passenger service several times to mark special occasions, as well as attending industry and promotional events and bus enthusiasts' rallies. As of winter 2019/20 it is stored out of service.

Buses are painted in Volkswagen 'Mars Red' - chosen to stand out against other bus operators in the area and as a nod to the 'Poppy Red' of National Bus Company days.

References

External links

Company website

Bus operators in Cambridgeshire
Bus operators in Norfolk
Transport companies established in 2015
2015 establishments in England